Burning Cities is the fifth studio album by Scottish punk rock and new wave band Skids, released on 12 January 2018. Produced by Killing Joke bassist Youth, this is the band's first studio album in 36 years, since the release of Joy in November 1981. It is their first album to feature Big Country father-and-son guitarists, Bruce and Jamie Watson, the second with drummer Mike Baillie, and third with founding bassist William Simpson. Tracks 5, 7, 9 and 11 are co-written by Martin Metcalfe. The album reached number 28 in the charts. It is also the first album not to feature any contribution from former guitarist Stuart Adamson, who died in 2001.

Track listing

Personnel
Skids
 Richard Jobson – lead vocals
 Bruce Watson – guitars
 Jamie Watson – guitars
 William Simpson – bass
 Mike Baillie – drums

Additional personnel
 Youth — guitars, backing vocals, bass
 Martin Metcalfe — guitars, backing vocals
 Derek Kelly – vibraphone, piano
 Susannah Clarke – violin
 Nick Turner – saxophone
 Michael Randall – keyboards, programming
 Jamie Grashion – keyboards, programming
 Rory Cowleson – keyboards (tracks 1, 2, 4)

Charts

References

Skids (band) albums
2018 albums
Albums produced by Youth (musician)